Analog Bubblebath Vol 2 is the second EP released by the musician Richard D. James. It is the second release in the Analogue Bubblebath series (although it is spelled "Analog Bubblebath" on this release).

The EP consists of three tracks and was released in 1991 on Rabbit City Records in the 12" vinyl format.

"Aboriginal Mix" was later released as "Digeridoo" on the single Digeridoo and the R&S Records compilation Classics. All three mixes are identical. In August 2015, James uploaded the third track to SoundCloud with the title "Alien Fanny Farts AB2 q".

Track listing

References

External links

"Alien Fanny Farts AB2 q" on SoundCloud

Aphex Twin EPs
1991 EPs